Soundtrack to Your Escape is the seventh studio album by Swedish heavy metal band In Flames, released on 29 March 2004.

The album was criticized by longtime fans because of a major change in musical style. However, the album was seen by many as a natural progression from Reroute to Remain and was critically praised by critics such as Metal Hammer and Kerrang!.  It reached number 3 in Sweden, number 45 on the American Billboard 200 chart (the band's first album to reach the Billboard 200), number 2 on the Top Heatseekers chart, and number 7 on the Independent Albums chart. This would mark the first album where the band would exclusively use drop A# tuning and abandoning the C standard tuning of previous albums.

Releases
The album is available in both a regular jewel case version featuring 12 tracks and a limited edition digipak with a bonus track, "Discover Me Like Emptiness". The Japanese version has an additional live track called "Clayman".

A special edition, which includes a bonus DVD with live footage and videos of the singles "The Quiet Place" and "Touch of Red", was also released. Music videos were produced for the songs "My Sweet Shadow", "Like You Better Dead", "Borders and Shading" and "F(r)iend".

Track listing

Personnel
In Flames
Anders Fridén – vocals
Björn Gelotte –  lead guitar
Jesper Strömblad – rhythm guitar
Peter Iwers – bass
Daniel Svensson – drums

Additional personnel
 Niklas Sundin – album cover
 Daniel Bergstrand – audio engineer, audio production, engineer, mixing, producer
 Björn Engelmann – mastering
 Örjan Örnkloo – keyboards, programming, engineering, mixing, sampling

Charts

References

2004 albums
In Flames albums
Nuclear Blast albums